Paraconalia brasiliensis is a beetle in the genus Paraconalia of the family Mordellidae. It was described in 1968 by Ermisch.

References

Mordellidae
Beetles described in 1968